Pommereschea is a genus of plants in the ginger family. There are two known species, native to China and Indochina:

Pommereschea lackneri Wittm. - Yunnan, Myanmar, Thailand
Pommereschea spectabilis (King & Prain) K.Schum. in H.G.A.Engler  - Yunnan, Myanmar

References

Zingiberoideae
Zingiberaceae genera